Amorupi is a genus of beetles in the family Cerambycidae, containing the following species:

 Amorupi fulvoterminata (Berg, 1889)
 Amorupi hudepohli (Martins, 1974)

References

Elaphidiini